Scribe Publications (or simply Scribe) is an independent publishing house founded by Henry Rosenbloom in Melbourne, Australia in 1976. It established a sister company, Scribe UK, in London in May 2013. Scribe publishes nonfiction and fiction by authors from around the world, including many titles in translation. It publishes over 60 books a year in Australia, over 50 in the United Kingdom, and over 30 in the United States. It has a scout in New York.

Awards
It was awarded the prize for "Australian Small Publisher of the Year" for 2006, 2008, 2010, 2011.

References

1976 establishments in Australia
Book publishing companies of Australia
Publishing companies established in 1976
Companies based in Melbourne